Frederick Carson may refer to:

Sir Charles Frederick Carson (1886–1960), Canadian Brigadier in the British Army
Frederick Carson, character in Angel (1937 film)
Fred Carson, secret identity of Wonder Man (Fox Publications)
Freddie Carson, character in Night Heat
Fred Carson, actor in Star Trek: The Original Series episode Operation -- Annihilate!

See also